Baahubali: The Beginning is a 2015 Indian epic historical fiction film written and directed by S. S. Rajamouli and produced by Arka Media Works. Shot simultaneously in Telugu and Tamil languages, the film stars Prabhas, Rana Daggubati, Anushka Shetty, and Tamannaah while Sathyaraj, Ramya Krishnan and Nassar appear in supporting roles. The soundtrack and music score was composed by M. M. Keeravani while K. K. Senthil Kumar provided the cinematography. Kotagiri Venkateswara Rao, Sabu Cyril and V. Srinivas Mohan were in charge of the film's editing, art direction and special effects respectively.

The first of two cinematic parts, The Beginning opened worldwide on 10 July 2015 to critical acclaim and record-breaking box-office success, becoming the highest-grossing film in India and the third-highest grossing Indian film worldwide, and the highest-grossing South Indian film. Grossing over ₹6.5 billion worldwide against a budget of ₹1.2 billion, the film became the first South Indian film, and the first non-Hindi film to gross over ₹1 billion in the dubbed Hindi version. The Beginning garnered several awards and nominations with praise for Rajamouli's direction, cinematography, production design, costumes and performances of the cast members.

At the 63rd National Film Awards, The Beginning won the Best Feature Film, becoming the first Telugu film to win the award, and Best Special Effects. At the 63rd Filmfare Awards South, the Telugu version won five awards from ten nominations, including Best Film, Best Director for Rajamouli and Best Supporting Actress for Krishnan. Both the Tamil and Telugu versions won several awards in their respective categories, including Best Picture, Best Direction for Rajamouli, and Best Performance In A Supporting Role (Female) for Krishnan at the 1st IIFA Utsavam. The Beginning became the first Indian film to be nominated for Saturn Awards, receiving five nominations at the 42nd ceremony, including Best Fantasy Film and Best Supporting Actress for Tamannaah.

Accolades

See also 
 List of Telugu films of 2015
 List of Tamil films of 2015

Footnotes

References

External links 
 

Baahubali (franchise)
Lists of accolades by Indian film